590 The Fan may refer to the following sports radio AM stations: 

KFNS (AM) - branded 590 The Fan, in St. Louis, Missouri.
CJCL - branded Sportsnet 590 The Fan, in Toronto, Ontario.